Sphaerotheca swani is a species of frog in the family Ranidae endemic to Nepal.

Its natural habitat is swamps.

References

Sphaerotheca (frog)
Amphibians of Nepal
Endemic fauna of Nepal
Amphibians described in 1956
Taxonomy articles created by Polbot